Ben Gray (born 12 November 1995) is an English professional rugby league footballer who last played as a  for the London Broncos in the Kingstone Press Championship.

Background
Gray was born in Leicester, Leicestershire, England.

Career
Gray has previously spent time on loan at the London Skolars.

References

External links
London Broncos profile
London Skolars profile

1995 births
Living people
English rugby league players
London Broncos players
London Skolars players
Rugby league players from Leicestershire
Rugby league props
Sportspeople from Leicester